The Christian Reformed Church in Costa Rica was started by missionaries from the Christian Reformed Church in North America who began to do mission work in the capital city of Costa Rica in 1982. Three congregations were established and later this work developed and congregations were founded in Esperanza, El Roble and Puntarenas. Pastoral training is carried out by the Farel Institution. The church has five congregations, one house fellowship and more than 200 members.

References

Reformed denominations in Central America
Protestantism in Costa Rica
Churches in Costa Rica